2013 Turkish Super Cup (Turkish: TFF Süper Kupa) was the 40th edition of the Turkish Super Cup since its establishment as Presidential Cup in 1966. The match was contested between the 2012–13 Süper Lig champions Galatasaray and the 2012–13 Turkish Cup winners Fenerbahçe, making the game the 375th edition of Kıtalar Arası Derbi. The game was a rematch of the  2012 Turkish Super Cup, which was won by title holders Galatasaray.

Background
This will be the 5th overall national super cup matchup between the teams since 1966, and the second matchup since 2006, when the cup was rebranded as TFF Süper Kupa. Galatasaray last won the cup in 2012 against Fenerbahçe, and Fenerbahçe last won the cup in 2009 against Beşiktaş. In their previous finals, both teams won twice. Galatasaray in 1996 and 2012, and Fenerbahçe in 1973 and 1985.

Path to the final
Galatasaray were champions in the regular season, finishing ten points ahead of Fenerbahçe. In the regular season, Galatasaray collected 71 points by 21 wins, 8 draws and 5 losses. They were trailed by Fenerbahçe, who collected 61 points by 18 wins, 7 draws and 9 losses.

Although runners-up of the league, Fenerbahçe performed better in the domestic cup. They entered the tournament at the fourth round. They won their fourth round match against Pendikspor. In the fifth round, they beat Göztepe. In the group stage they were drawn against Sivasspor, 1461 Trabzon, and Bursaspor but were winners in the group. The semi-finals were the toughest home and away matches for Fenerbahçe, as they struggled against Eskişehirspor but were winners after a penalty shoot-out. In the 2013 Turkish Cup Final they were crowned champions against rivals Trabzonspor by a decisive 1–0 win. This was a consecutive win for Fenerbahçe, as they were title holders of the 2012 Turkish Cup Final.

Match

Details

See also
 2012–13 Süper Lig
 2012–13 Turkish Cup

References

2013
Super Cup
Super Cup 2013
Galatasaray S.K. (football) matches